The Wally Parks NHRA Motorsports Museum is located on the edge of the Los Angeles County Fairplex. It houses a collection of memorabilia, automobiles, and motorcycles related to the sport of hot-rodding.

History
The museum was created by a group of long-time NHRA staff members and led by founder Wally Parks, for whom the museum was renamed on Parks' ninetieth birthday.  The Automobile Club of Southern California stepped in as the presenting sponsor of the museum.  Steve Gibbs, now a retired vice-president of NHRA, led the team that reconditioned a WPA-constructed  building on the grounds of the Fairplex to house the museum, which opened to the public in 1998.

Despite the COVID-19 pandemic since 2020, the museum stays open with precautionary measures enforced that include wearing masks and social distancing.

Collections

Temporary exhibits have also been created to honor participants in hot rodding including Vic Edelbrock, Don Prudhomme, the 1932 Ford, Track Roadsters, Parnelli Jones, and the So-Cal Speed Shop.

In 2008, the museum began hosting a special exhibition dedicated to Gale Banks and his contributions to the sport of drag racing. The exhibit is entitled "Banks Power: The First 50 Years."

Finances
The museum is structured as a non-profit organization under the laws of the United States, section 501(c)(3) of the Internal Revenue Code.  It produces and benefits from two annual hot rod reunions.  The Holley NHRA National Hot Rod Reunion is held in June at Beech Bend Park in Bowling Green, Kentucky,.  The NHRA California Hot Rod Reunion is held in October at Famoso Raceway in Bakersfield, California.

References

External links

Museums established in 1998
Automobile museums in California
Sports in Pomona, California
Museums in Los Angeles County, California
Sports museums in California
Buildings and structures in Pomona, California
1998 establishments in California